Chevilly-Larue is a commune in the southern suburbs of Paris, France.

Name
Chevilly-Larue was originally called simply Chevilly. The name Chevilly was recorded for the first time in 829 (in a donation by Eucade, bishop of Paris) as Civiliacum, probably meaning "estate of Civilis", a Gallo-Roman landowner.

On 5 September 1921 the name of the commune officially became Chevilly-Larue in order to distinguish it from the homonymous commune of Chevilly in the Loiret département. Larue was a hamlet located within the commune. Founded at the end of the Hundred Years' War along the small road from L'Haÿ-les-Roses to Fresnes, it was originally called La Ruelle (meaning "the lane", the "alleyway"), later corrupted into La Rue and eventually Larue.

Geography
Neighboring communes: L'Haÿ-les-Roses, Fresnes, Rungis, Thiais and Vitry-sur-Seine.

Transport
Chevilly-Larue is served by no station of the Paris Métro, RER, or suburban rail network. The closest station to Chevilly-Larue is Villejuif – Louis Aragon station on Métro line . This station is located in the neighboring commune of Villejuif,  from the town center of Chevilly-Larue.

At the end of 2010, a project was put in discussion as to the extension of Paris Métro Line 14 and implantation of two stations in the commune. This project has also been adopted as part of the Grand Paris Express project; the commune will be served, by 2027, by two metro stations: "MIN porte de Thiais" in the south and "Chevilly Trois Communes" located in L'Haÿ-les-Roses in the north.

Population

Education
Schools in the commune include:
Two preschools: Ecole maternelle Jacques-Gilbert Collet and Ecole maternelle Salvador Allende
Three primary school groups: Groupe scolaire Pasteur, Groupe scolaire Paul Bert, and Groupe scolaire Pierre et Marie Curie
Two junior high schools: Collège Jean Moulin and Collège Liberté
One senior high school/sixth-form college: Lycée polyvalent Pauline Roland Chevilly-Larue

The Holy Ghost Fathers had a seminary in Chevilly.

See also
Communes of the Val-de-Marne department

References

External links

Official website 

Communes of Val-de-Marne